is a former Japanese football player.

Playing career
Shogo Nakatsuru played for V-Varen Nagasaki and Fujieda MYFC from 2010 to 2015.

References

External links

1987 births
Living people
Fukuoka University alumni
Association football people from Fukuoka Prefecture
Japanese footballers
J3 League players
Japan Football League players
V-Varen Nagasaki players
Fujieda MYFC players
Association football midfielders